Zamek Kiszewski  (German Schloß Kischau) is a village in the administrative district of Gmina Stara Kiszewa, within Kościerzyna County, Pomeranian Voivodeship, in northern Poland.

For details of the history of the region, see History of Pomerania.

The village has a population of 216.

References

Zamek Kiszewski